This is a timeline of overnight television broadcasting in the United Kingdom. It focuses on programming between midnight and 6am and includes details of when channels began into the night and 24-hour broadcasting.

1980s
1983
LWT launches an into-the-night Nightlife strand, resulting in LWT staying on air until around 2am on Friday and Saturday nights.
1984
4–12 August – During the second week of the 1984 Summer Olympic Games, the BBC extends its live coverage until around 4am. Rather than closing down, the BBC fills the gap with Ceefax Olympics AM which provides news from the Games to fill the gap between the end of live coverage and the start of Olympic Breakfast Time.
1985
 No events.
1986
2 April – The first in-vision teletext service is seen on ITV when Central launches its Jobfinder service which broadcasts for one hour after the end of the day's programming. Many other regions launch their own Jobfinder service later in the 1980s.
9 August – Yorkshire launches an experimental overnight service, simulcasting the satellite TV channel Music Box.
1987
3 January – Closedowns reappear on Yorkshire Television when its experiment with 24-hour television is put on hiatus.
13 January – Yorkshire becomes the second ITV region to launch a Jobfinder service, broadcasting for an hour after closedown
23 April 
Channel 4 starts broadcasting into the early hours on Thursdays, Fridays and Saturdays when it launches Nightime. One of the programmes is the discussion show After Dark which was broadcast live and with no scheduled end time.
Yorkshire extends broadcasting into the early hours on Thursday, Friday and Saturday nights by introducing a Through Till Three strand.
25 April – Central becomes the first station to keep its transmitters on air all night when it launches More Central. Programmes are shown until around 3am on weekdays and 4am at the weekend, with the rest of the night filled by its Jobfinder service.
1 June – Thames launches Thames Into the Night, broadcasting until around 4am. Consequently, Thames no longer broadcasts its end of day epilogue Night Thoughts.
17 August – Thames becomes the first ITV company to launch a full 24-hour service. 
28 August 
LWT and Anglia begin 24-hour transmissions
LWT launches the UK's first overnight show Night Network.
7 December – Tyne Tees begins 24-hour broadcasting. It does so by launching a Jobfinder service which broadcasts each night from its usual close-down time until the start of TV-am at 6am.
 1988
25 January – TVS launches Late Night Late and gradually extends its broadcast hours over the next few months.
 15 February 
Channel 4 starts broadcasting into the early hours every night, closing down between 2am and 3am. Previously Channel 4 had closed down on Sundays to Wednesdays at between midnight and 1am.
An early morning 60-minute news programme – ITN Early Morning News – is launched but is only available in areas which have 24-hour broadcasting. The first 30 minutes of the programme includes a full broadcast of ITN's international news bulletin ITN World News. In addition, brief news summaries are broadcast at various points through the night. The launch coincides with three of the major ITV companies, Scottish, Central and Granada, beginning 24-hour transmission. 
30 May – Yorkshire recommences 24-hour broadcasting.
20 June – TVS and Channel begin 24-hour broadcasting.
22 August – HTV begins 24-hour broadcasting. The service, called Night Club, is broadcast on both HTV West and HTV Wales.
2 September 
TSW, Grampian and Border begin 24-hour broadcasting. 
Granada launches an overnight service called Night Time to make it easier for the smaller companies to introduce 24-hour broadcasting. TSW, Border and Grampian take the service, as does Tyne Tees which replaces its all-night showing of Jobfinder with the new service. Jobfinder is part of Night Time and airs as a regional service between 4am and 5am on weeknights.
17 September–2 October – Channel 4 broadcasts all night for the first time to provide full live coverage of the 1988 Olympic Games. BBC1 also provides all night Games coverage and consequently broadcasts non-stop for 16 days.
3 October – Ulster begins 24 hour broadcasting. Ulster had planned to commence 24-hour transmissions a month earlier but it was delayed because of a last minute decision to take the overnight service provided by Granada and not that provided by Central.
Autumn – The BBC takes its first tentative steps into later closedowns. Previously, weekday programmes ended no later than 12:15am and weekend broadcasting had finished by 1:30am.
1989
6 February – Sky Television launches and one of the four channels, Sky News, broadcasts a 24-hour service from day one. Sky Channel airs teletext pages during its overnight downtime.
31 March – Night Network ends after a little more than 18 months on air.

1990s
1990
24 January–3 February – As it had during the 1988 Summer Olympics, BBC1 again broadcasts throughout the night to provide live coverage of a major sporting event, this time to cover the 1990 Commonwealth Games in Auckland, New Zealand.
1991
16 January–2 March – The BBC and ITV broadcast extensive live coverage of the Gulf War, both in terms of extended news bulletins and special programmes. An all-night bulletin is broadcast on ITV during the initial stages of the War with BBC1 staying up through the night, broadcasting Pages from Ceefax to keep viewers up to date.
March – Following the conclusion of the Gulf War, the ITN Early Morning News is halved in length and now goes on air at 5:30am. From this point, the ITN World News is no longer broadcast as part of the bulletin.
April – LWT and Thames launch a new overnight strand ITV Night Time.
28 April – HTV closes down its Night Club and replaces it with a simulcast of the overnight generic service from London.
6 May —  Sky Movies and The Movie Channel begin broadcasting 24 hours a day. Previously they had been on air from early afternoon until the early hours of the next morning.
August – TVS discontinues their own overnight strand Late Night Late and is replaced by a new ITV Night Time service from London, provided by Thames from Monday to Thursday and LWT from Friday to Sunday. For the first time, both London companies utilised the same on-screen branding throughout the week, the only notable difference being LWT's near non-use of a continuity announcer at the weekend.
1 September – Anglia's Through the Night service ends. It is replaced by the generic overnight service from London which is also broadcast on HTV.
October – Scottish rebrands its overnight service as Scottish Night Time and removes the overnight in-vision continuity.
1992
21 January – BBC Select is launched as an overnight subscription service.
5 October – Following the merger of Yorkshire and Tyne Tees, the two ITV companies begin broadcasting the same overnight service called Nightshift.
1993
1 January 
Granada’s overnight service begins broadcasting on Anglia, HTV Wales, HTV West (from 1 January 1993) and on Westcountry which had replaced TSW as ITV’s South West of England contractor.
The new ITV franchise holder for London weekdays, Carlton introduced a new Nightime service, airing from Monday–Thursday nights and simulcast by Meridian and Channel Television.
3 January – 3 Nights is launched by LWT as its overnight service. Output includes some of LWT’s local programmes.
January – On Friday, Saturday and Sunday nights, Meridian and Channel broadcast its own version of Nighttime, presented in-vision from Southampton by ex-Late Night Late presenter Graham Rogers. Both Carlton and Meridian/Channel services utilised the same on-screen branding and presentation throughout the week. Programming largely consists of output airing on the other services as well as imports including French soap Riviera and in the case of Meridian, regional programming, including World Of Sailing and Freescreen, an experimental series featuring viewers' videos and social action features.
19 January – Schools programmes are shown overnight on BBC2 for the first time as part of a new experiment called Night School. The broadcasts are generally either subject blocks or series blocks. 
Instead of fully closing down, 4-Tel on View is shown throughout Channel 4’s overnight downtime. The teletext pages are accompanied by continuous tone with music only being played in the final 30-or-so minuets prior to the start of the next day’s programmes.
1994
19 June – More Central which had been the brand name for Central’s overnight broadcasting since it began nighttime transmissions in 1987, ends.
Yorkshire and Tyne Tees resume local overnight continuity, after two years of sharing overnight continuity although the schedule and the overnight brand name of Nightshift is retained by both regions.
1995
February – Central ends its own nighttime programming and carries the London overnight service although opt-outs for Jobfinder and other regional programming continues.
13 February –  London News Network (a subsidiary of Carlton & LWT) launches a revamped overnight service featuring new neon-themed presentation without any station-specific branding. Following the launch of the LNN service over much of the ITV network, Meridian's overnight service expanded to seven days a week in February 1995 and began airing in the Anglia region. Overnight continuity links were discontinued in favour of announcer-less idents and presentation. 
5 June – Granada closes its Night Time service and replaces it with the new national overnight service from London. Consequently, Border, Grampian, UTV, HTV Wales (5 June–31 December 1995), HTV West and Westcountry all take the London service.
9 October – BBC Learning Zone is launched, broadcasting education programmes all night on BBC2. It replaces BBC Select and Night School.
16 October – Following the launch of the BBC Learning Zone, Pages from Ceefax is broadcast in the gaps between the end of regular programmes and the start of Learning Zone broadcasts. This is the first time that Ceefax is broadcast overnight on a regular basis.
1996
January – Meridian's programming is adopted by HTV and Westcountry, albeit with separate local presentation from HTV's presentation centre in Cardiff. 
September – Meridian revamps and relaunches its overnight service as The Edge. The service largely carried the same programmes provided by LNN with some regional opt-outs for programmes such as Meridian’s World of Sailing and Freescreen.
1997
6 January – Channel 4 starts 24-hour broadcasting, resulting in the end of 4-Tel on View.
31 March – Channel 5 begins broadcasting and from day one, the station broadcasts 24 hours a day with American sport being shown through the night on weekdays.
9 November – BBC News 24 launches and from that day, instead of closing down, BBC One simulcasts the new continuous news channel through the night.
1998
14 January – ITV Nightscreen launches as an overnight filler on ITV. Broadcast as teletext pages, the service features news and information about ITV and its programmes.
Early in 1998, BBC2 stops shutting down its transmitters when it isn’t broadcasting the BBC Learning Zone. Instead, BBC2 broadcasts Pages from Ceefax during all overnight downtime.
9 March – ITV Night Time launches on Tyne Tees and Yorkshire, bringing to an end to their Nightshift after nearly six years.
2 November – The SMG relaunches its own overnight programming for its two regions, Scottish and Grampian. The overnight strand is called Nighttime TV.
Meridian drops The Edge and replaces it with a set of idents using generic ITV branding. These idents were amended later that year to reflect the change of ITV's generic logo and continued to be used until May 2000, by which time, Meridian had adopted the generic overnight branding used by the rest of the network since November 1999.
1999
9 November – ITV Night Time is rolled out to many more ITV regions, including Granada, Border, Central, Tyne Tees, UTV and Yorkshire. At this time, ITV phases out the Night Time logos and presentation on overnight shows by late 1999 with generic network branding taking its place in most regions and ITV Nightscreen starting to take up timeslots towards the end of the night although Central and Yorkshire partially opt out of Nightscreen to show Jobfinder.

2000s
2000
May – ITV Night Time begins on Anglia, Channel, HTV Wales, HTV West, Meridian and Westcountry. 
BBC One starts showing recent programmes with in-vision signing in a slot called  Sign Zone. Programmes are broadcast for the first half of the night with BBC News 24 continuing to air for the remainder of the night.
2001
29 August – Many of the former overnight programmes associated with the old Night Network and Night Time services are replaced with repeats of networked daytime shows (many of these including on-screen BSL signing for the deaf). Scottish and Grampian (both branded overnight as "Nighttime TV") continue to run their own overnight schedule.
2002
No events.
2003
Teletext pages are no longer used for ITV Nightscreen when the format of the pages is transferred to a format using Scala InfoChannel3.
Central’s overnight opt-outs from ITV Night Time end.
2004
A reduction in airtime for BBC Learning Zone means that more airtime is given over to Pages from Ceefax.
Scottish and Grampian (both branded overnight as "Nighttime TV") continued to run its own overnight schedule until around late 2004.
2005
December – ITV begins airing participation quiz programming during much of its overnight hours in the form of Quizmania and later, ITV Play output such as The Mint and Make Your Play.
2006
 No events.
2007
23 December – Make Your Play, a remnant from ITV Play, ends, bringing to an end all call participation programming on ITV.
2008
January – Following the cancelling of its participation programming, ITV Nightscreen is now broadcast for much of the night on ITV.
2009
No events.

2010s
2010
22 April – Launch of The Nightshift on STV Central. The overnight service launches on STV North on 13 July.
ITV launches The Zone for 2 hours, a gaming and shopping programme block, usually airing from 12:30am to 2:30am.
2011
12 April – The Nightshift begins airing separate editions in each of STV's four sub-regional areas.
Later in 2011, he sub-regional editions of The Nightshift are axed and are replaced with a single pan-regional edition serving both of the Northern and Central areas, with opt-outs for regional news. 
Towards the end of 2011, ITV Channel Television's Channel Nightscreen, which had consisted of local news headlines and programming information, is axed towards the end of 2011, finishing shortly after ITV plc had brought Channel Television.
December – The Nightshift is reduced from airing nightly to being on air on four nights a week, airing on Thursday–Sunday nights.
2012
27 April – The Store with JML launches on ITV.  It broadcasts across ITV's late night two-hour retail teleshopping schedule on Sundays, and overnight on ITV4.
22 October – At 5:59am, the final transmission of Pages from Ceefax comes to an end with special continuity announcements and a specially created end caption featuring various Ceefax graphics from over the years.
27 October – Instead of showing pages from the BBC’s digital text service during BBC Two’s overnight downtime, the channel instead launches This is BBC Two which is a loop of forthcoming BBC Two programmes.
21 December – The final edition of ITV's early morning news programme ITV News at 5:30 is broadcast. Consequently, apart from special events such as election results programmes, there is no longer any overnight news coverage on ITV.
2013
The overnight showing of recent programmes with in-vision signing moves to BBC Two.
2014
February – STV's The Nightshift once again becomes a seven-days-a-week programme, but only for four months when in June it reverts to being shown on four nights each week.
2015
1 July – STV's The Nightshift ends its original run. It briefly returns on 27 August but ends again on 1 October.
2 October –After Midnight, a rolling service of regional news and local programming highlights from the STV City channels, launches as STV's replacement overnight slot.
2016
 No events.
2017
 No events.
2018
 No events.
2019
1 August – Home shopping channel Ideal World begins simulcasting on ITV during part of the overnight period on ITV.

2020s
2020
 No events.
2021
1 October – ITV Nightscreen is broadcast for the final time, ending after nearly 24 years. It is replaced the following night by Unwind with ITV/Unwind with STV.

See also
 Night Network
 Graveyard slot

References

Culture-related timelines
Timelines of mass media in the United Kingdom
British history timelines
Television in the United Kingdom by year
United Kingdom television timelines